Hugh Quay Parmer (August 3, 1939 – May 27, 2020) was an attorney, University professor, international humanitarian executive, and Democratic politician in Fort Worth, Texas. He served in both houses of the Texas State Legislature, on the Fort Worth City Council, and as mayor of Fort Worth. Parmer also served as assistant administrator of the United States Agency for International Development and chief of the Humanitarian Response Bureau under the Agency where he was responsible for emergency U. S. response to over 80 declared disasters both natural and man-made around the world.  He followed that with seven years as president and CEO of the American Refugee Committee, a U. S. based humanitarian relief organization with 2000 employees in 14 disaster and conflict impacted nations around the world.

Humanitarian career 
In 1998 Parmer was appointed by U.S.President Bill Clinton as the Assistant Administrator of the U. S. Agency for International Development (USAID) in charge of the Bureau of Humanitarian Response. Parmer was unanimously confirmed for the post by the Republican controlled U. S. Senate. During his tenure at USAID, Parmer was largely responsible for U.S. humanitarian operations during the Kosovo War.
After the election of President George W. Bush in 2000, Parmer was selected as president of the American Refugee Committee, an international humanitarian relief organization with programs in 14 conflict impacted countries around the world. In 2008, he was elected to the board of directors of Interaction, the largest association of U.S. based private relief and development organizations.

Recent activities
Before his death, Parmer was an adjunct professor at the University of North Texas in Denton, Texas, Southern Methodist University in Dallas, Texas, and Texas Christian University in Fort Worth, Texas. He taught senior undergraduate and graduate seminars in International Aid, Humanitarian Intervention and Refugee Affairs.

Parmer died in Fort Worth on May 27, 2020.

References

 

1939 births
2020 deaths
Businesspeople from Texas
Texas city council members
Mayors of Fort Worth, Texas
Yale University alumni
Democratic Party members of the Texas House of Representatives
Democratic Party Texas state senators
Texas lawyers
People of the United States Agency for International Development